Dragojevac may refer to:

Dragojevac (Arilje), a village in Arilje, Serbia
Dragojevac (Vladimirci), a village in Vladimirci, Serbia